Firmin Pierre Breaux (September 22, 1749 – October 1, 1808) was an Acadian pioneer known for unofficially founding the city of Breaux Bridge, Louisiana.

Life
Firmin was the son of Alexis Breaux and Marguerite Barrieu, born at Riviere aux Canards, near present day Port Williams, Nova Scotia in 1749. In 1755, Firmin's family, along with many other Acadians, were deported from Canada into Boston during the expulsion of the Acadians. In 1767, at the age of 17, Firmin found himself at the Bayou Tortue in Louisiana, while the rest of his family returned to Canada. By 1769, Firmin had moved into a house in present day St. James Parish, and had been married to his wife Marguerite Braud.

He died October 1, 1808 in Breaux Bridge.

Breaux Bridge
In 1771, Firmin bought land near the Bayou Teche from the wealthy New Orleans merchant, Jean François Ledée, who had acquired the land as a French land grant. By 1774, Breaux's branding iron had been registered, and by 1786 he was one of the largest property owners near the Bayou Teche.

In 1799, Breaux built a footbridge across the Bayou Teche, in order to ease the passage of his family and neighbors across the Teche.

References

1749 births
1808 deaths
Acadian people